Allothereua is a genus of scutigeromorph centipedes containing 9 species ranging from Central Asia (Kazakhstan and Nepal) to the Philippines to Australia, where at least six species are found. A 2009 study of scutigeromorph phylogeny found Allothereua to be polyphyletic; some species were more closely related to Parascutigera.

Species
Allothereua bidenticulata Verhoeff, 1925 - Australia
Allothereua caeruleata  Verhoeff, 1925 - Australia
Allothereua incola Verhoeff, 1925 - Australia
Allothereua kirgisorum Lignau, 1929 - Kazakhstan
Allothereua lesueurii (Lucas, 1840) - Australia
Allothereua maculata  (Newport, 1844) - Australia
Allothereua manila Chamberlin, 1944 - Philippines
Allothereua serrulata Verhoeff, 1925 - Australia
Allothereua wilsonae Dobroruka, 1979 - Nepal

References

Centipede genera